James Lewis Morrill (September 24, 1891 – July 1979) was a professor and academic administrator who served as the president of the University of Wyoming and the University of Minnesota. He attended Ohio State University for his undergraduate education and, after a brief career as a journalist, he returned there for a career in teaching and administration. In 1942 he left to accept the position of president at the University of Wyoming. After only three years he was recruited to become the eighth president of the University of Minnesota. During his time at the University of Minnesota he oversaw a period of immense growth; enrollment at the school more than doubled in a single year due in large part to returning servicemen using the G.I. Bill to pursue a college education. Morrill put forward a plan to expand the campus across the Mississippi River to ensure the university would have room to accommodate the coming generation of baby boomers. After retiring in 1960 he moved to Ohio. He died in 1979.

References

1891 births
1979 deaths
Presidents of the University of Minnesota
Presidents of the University of Wyoming
20th-century American academics